Sofía Arami Villalba Méndez (born 3 January 2003) is a Paraguayan handball player for Cerro Porteño and the Paraguay national team.

She was selected to represent Paraguay at the 2021 World Women's Handball Championship.

References

2003 births
Living people
Paraguayan female handball players
21st-century Paraguayan women
South American Games medalists in handball
South American Games silver medalists for Paraguay
Competitors at the 2022 South American Games